Desmond Tan Kok Ming (born 1970) is a Singaporean politician, union leader and former brigadier-general who has been serving as Minister of State in the Prime Minister's Office and Deputy Secretary-General of the National Trade Union Congress since 2022. He previously served as Minister of State for Home Affairs and Minister of State for Sustainability and the Environment concurrently between 2020 and 2022. A member of the governing People's Action Party (PAP), he has been the Member of Parliament (MP) representing the Pasir Ris Central division of Pasir Ris–Punggol GRC since 2020.

Prior to entering politics, Tan had served 28 years in the Singapore Armed Forces (SAF) and attained the rank Brigadier-General. He also served as Chief Executive Director of the People's Association between 2017 and 2020. He made his political debut in the 2020 general election when he joined a five-member PAP team contesting in Pasir Ris–Punggol GRC and they won with 64.15% of the vote.

Early life and education
Tan grew up with his three siblings living in a three-room HDB flat in Bukit Ho Swee where his father worked as a taxi driver while his mother takes up odd jobs.

He attended Queenstown Secondary Technical School and Raffles Junior College before graduating from the University of Manchester with a Bachelor of Engineering degree with honours in aeronautical engineering in 1994 under the Singapore Armed Forces Merit Scholarship. He also completed a master's degree in defence strategic studies at King's College London in 2000 and a Master of Business Administration at Nanyang Technological University.

Career

Military career
Tan started his career in the Singapore Armed Forces and spent 28 years in the military before rising to the rank of Brigadier-General. During his service, he held various appointments, including Chief of Staff – General Staff, Director of Joint Operations, Chief Guards Officer, and Director of Public Affairs. He was also Chairman of the NDP 2012 Executive Committee, and had participated in the International Security Assistance Force in Afghanistan as Singapore's contingent commander. He received the SAF Overseas Medal (Enhanced) and NATO (ISAF) Medal.

Public service
After retiring from the Singapore Armed Forces in 2017, Tan joined the People's Association as its Chief Executive Director before stepping down in June 2020 to run for election in the 2020 general election.

Political career
Tan made his political debut in the 2020 general election when he joined a five-member People's Action Party (PAP) team contesting in Pasir Ris–Punggol GRC. The PAP team won with 64.15% of the vote against the Singapore Democratic Alliance and Peoples Voice, and Tan was elected as the Member of Parliament representing the Pasir Ris Central ward of Pasir Ris–Punggol GRC.

On 27 July 2020, he was appointed Minister of State for Home Affairs and Minister of State for Sustainability and the Environment.

On 6 June 2022, a Cabinet reshuffle was announced by Prime Minister Lee Hsien Loong and Tan would relinquish his positions of Minister of State for Home Affairs and Minister of State for Sustainability and the Environment and assume the position of Minister of State in the Prime Minister's Office.

The move was to allow Tan to take less responsibilities and devote less attention in the government which he would be in part-time basis after joining the labour movement National Trades Union Congress (NTUC) after the departure of its Deputy Secretary-General Chee Hong Tat from NTUC to return to the government on full-time basis. These changes took effect a week later on 13 June 2022.

Personal life 
Tan is married with three children.

References 

1970 births
Living people
Alumni of King's College London
Members of the Parliament of Singapore
People's Action Party politicians
Singaporean politicians of Chinese descent